"Satellite" is a song by British band the Beloved, released as the first single from their fifth album, X (1996). It was the biggest hit from the album, peaking at No. 19 on the UK Singles Chart.

Critical reception
Jon O'Brien from AllMusic described the song as "anthemic", "Italo house-inspired" and a valiant attempt "at a more experimental sound". Ross Jones from The Guardian commented, "The Beloved here spray us with the very essence of New Age techno friskiness. You may think you've heard it before, but the Beloved songs are like massages in more ways than one – no two are ever the same." Daisy & Havoc from Music Weeks RM Dance Update rated it five out of five, writing, "As so much house music concentrates on being dross and proud of it, the sweet sounds of The Beloved become ever more necessary for national sanity. This is a pretty up and jumping track (well...in Beloved terms) with some especially good backing vocals worked in here, there and everywhere." Another editor, James Hamilton declared it as a "drily drawled frisky fluttering pop jiggler".

Music video
In a similar style to the music video for their earlier single "Sweet Harmony", the video  of "Satellite" consisted of a naked Jon Marsh, Helena Marsh, and a posse of other equally naked females lipsynching the lyrics.

Track listings

 CD single "Satellite" — 4:15
 "Satellite" (Transformer Vocal) — 8:26
 "Satellite" (Kundalini Rising) — 8:46
 "Satellite" (Freedom Vocal) — 7:31
 "Satellite" (High Lite Dub) — 6:56

 12" single "Satellite" (Transformer Vocal) — 8:26
 "Satellite" (Transmission Dub) — 7:54
 "Satellite" (Kundalini Rising) — 8:46
 "Satellite" (Freedom Dub) — 5:09		
			
 Double 12" promo'
 "Satellite" (Transformer Vocal) — 8:26
 "Satellite" (Freedom Dub) — 5:09		
 "Satellite" (Body-Pella) — 1:28		
 "Satellite" (Kundalini Rising) — 8:46
 "Satellite" (Royal Dub) — 6:24
 "Satellite" (Release-A-Pella) — 0:59
 "Satellite" (Freedom Vocal) — 7:31
 "Satellite" (Transmission Dub) — 7:54
 "Satellite" (High Lite Dub) — 6:56
 "Satellite" (Full House) — 6:04
 "Satellite" (Blackjack Beats) — 3:00

Charts

References

1996 singles
1996 songs
The Beloved (band) songs
Songs written by Jon Marsh
Songs written by Helena Marsh
East West Records singles